are a class of supernatural  entities and spirits in Japanese folklore. Despite often being translated as such,  are not literally demons in the Western sense of the word, but are instead spirits and entities. Their behavior can range from malevolent or mischievous to benevolent to humans.

Japanese folklorists and historians explain  as personifications of "supernatural or unaccountable phenomena to their informants." In the Edo period, many artists, such as Toriyama Sekien, invented new  by taking inspiration from folk tales or purely from their own imagination. Today, several such  (such as the ) are mistakenly thought to originate in more traditional folklore.

Concept
According to Japanese ideas of animism, spirit-like entities were believed to reside in all things, including natural phenomena and objects. Neither type of spirit was considered to be .

One's ancestors and particularly respected departed elders could also be deemed to be , accruing status as protective spirits who brought fortune to those who worshipped them.

Despite the existence of harmful spirits, rituals for converting  into  were performed, aiming to quell maleficent spirits, prevent misfortune and alleviate the fear arising from phenomena and events that otherwise had no explanation.

Elements of the tales and legends surrounding  began to be depicted in public entertainment, beginning as early as the Middle Ages in Japan. During and following the Edo period, the mythology and lore of  became more defined and formalized.

Types
 Categories based on a 's "true form":
 Human
 Animal
 Plant
 Object
 Natural phenomenon
 Categories depending on the source of mutation:
 Mutation related to this world
 Spiritual or mentally related mutation
 Reincarnation or afterworld related mutation
 Material related mutation
 Categories based on external appearance:
 Human
 Animal
 Plant
 Artifact
 Structure or building
 Natural object or phenomenon
 Miscellaneous or appearance compounding more than one category

In other folklorist categorizations,  are classified, similarly to the nymphs of Greek mythology, by their location or the phenomena associated with their manifestation.  are indexed in the book  as follows:
  (mountains)
  (paths)
  (trees)
  (water)
  (the sea)
  (snow)
  (sound)
  (animals, either real or imaginary)

History

Ancient history
 Middle of the Heian period (794–1185/1192): In The Pillow Book by Sei Shōnagon, there is the statement "there are tenacious ", as well as a statement by Murasaki Shikibu that "the  have become quite dreadful", which are the first appearances of the word .

The ancient times were a period abundant in literature and folktales mentioning and explaining . The  that appear in this literature were passed on to later generations. However, despite the literature mentioning and explaining these , they were never given any visual depictions.

Yamata no Orochi was originally a local god but turned into a  who was slain by Susanoo.

Post-classical history

Publications included:
These  were about  that come from even older times.
These  told of  mutations of animals.
 The , which told tales of thrown away none-too-precious objects that come to have a spirit residing in them planning evil deeds against humans, and ultimately get exorcised and sent to peace.
 The , depicting many different kinds of  all marching together
In this way,  that were mentioned only in writing were given a visual appearance in the Middle Ages.

The next major change in  came after the period of warring states, in the Edo period.

Modern history

Edo period 

As a result,  shops that handled such books spread and became widely used, making the general public's impression of each  fixed, spreading throughout all of Japan. When the  became popular in the Edo period, it is thought that one reason for the appearance of new  was a demand for entertaining ghost stories about  no one has ever heard of before, resulting in some that were simply made up for the purpose of telling an entertaining story.

They are also frequently depicted in ukiyo-e, and there are artists that have drawn famous  like Utagawa Kuniyoshi, Yoshitoshi, Kawanabe Kyōsai, and Hokusai, and there are also  books made by artists of the Kanō school.

Thus, with the development of a publishing culture,  depictions that were treasured in temples and shrines were able to become something more familiar to people, and it is thought that this is the reason that even though  were originally things to be feared, they have then become characters that people feel close to.

Meiji and Taishō periods 

It introduced folktales from Europe, such as the Grimm Tales.
 1900: Performance of the kabuki play  at the Kabuki-za in January.
Shirai expositioned on plant  from the point of view of a plant pathologist and herbalist.

With the Meiji Restoration, Western ideas and translated western publications began to make an impact, and western tales were particularly sought after. Also, in 1908, Kyōka Izumi and Tobari Chikufuu jointedly translated Gerhart Hauptmann's play The Sunken Bell.

Shōwa period 
Since  have been introduced in various kinds of media, they have become well known among the old, the young, men and women.

In this way,  are spoken about in legends in various forms, but traditional oral storytelling by the elders and the older people is rare, and regionally unique situations and background in oral storytelling are not easily conveyed. As a result, even for those born in the first decade of the Shōwa period (1925–1935), except for some who were evacuated to the countryside, they would feel that those things that become  are "not familiar" and "not very understandable". For example, in classical , even though people understand the words and what they refer to, they are not able to imagine it as something that could be realistic.

During the 1970s, many books were published that introduced  through encyclopedias, illustrated reference books, and dictionaries as a part of children's horror books, but along with the  that come from classics like folklore, and essays, it has been pointed out by modern research that there are some mixed in that do not come from classics, but were newly created. There has been much criticism that this mixing of classical  with newly created  is making light of tradition and legends. However, since there have already been those from the Edo period like Sekien Toriyama who created many new , there is also the opinion that it is unreasonable to criticize modern creations without doing the same for classical creations too. Furthermore, there is a favorable view that says that introducing various  characters through these books nurtured creativity and emotional development of young readers of the time.

In popular culture

 are often referred to as Japanese spirits or East Asian ghosts, like the  legend or the story of the "Slit-mouthed girl", both of which hail from Japanese legend. The term  can also be interpreted as "something strange or unusual".

See also

 
  (legendary beings from the Ryukyu Islands)

References

Further reading
 Ballaster, R. (2005). Fables of the East, Oxford University Press.
 Fujimoto, Nicole. "Yôkai und das Spiel mit Fiktion in der edozeitlichen Bildheftliteratur"  (Archive). Nachrichten der Gesellschaft für Natur- und Völkerkunde Ostasiens (NOAG), University of Hamburg. Volume 78, issues 183–184 (2008). pp. 93–104.
 Hearn, L. (2005). Kwaidan: Stories and Studies of Strange Things, Tuttle Publishing.
 Komatsu, K. (2017). An Introduction to Yōkai Culture: Monsters, Ghosts, and Outsiders in Japanese History, Japan Publishing Industry Foundation for Culture, .
 Meyer, M. (2012). The Night Parade of One Hundred Demons, .
 Phillip, N. (2000). Annotated Myths & Legends, Covent Garden Books.
 Tyler, R. (2002). Japanese Tales (Pantheon Fairy Tale & Folklore Library), Random House, .
 Yoda, H. and Alt, M. (2012). Yokai Attack! The Japanese Monster Survival Guide, Tuttle Publishing, .
 Yoda, H. and Alt, M. (2016). Japandemonium Illustrated: The Yokai Encyclopedias of Toriyama Sekien, Dover Publishing, .

External links

 Yōkai and Kaidan (PDF; 1.1 MB)
 The Ōishi Hyōroku Monogatari Picture Scroll
 Database of images of Strange Phenomena and Yōkai (Monstrous Beings)
 Collection: Supernatural in Japanese Art, from University of Michigan Museum of Art

 
Japanese words and phrases